The Dialogue of Jason and Papiscus is a lost early Christian text in Greek describing the dialogue of a converted Jew, Jason, and an Alexandrian Jew, Papiscus. The text is first mentioned, critically, in the True Account of the anti-Christian writer Celsus (c. 178 AD), and therefore would have been contemporary with the surviving, and much more famous, Dialogue between the convert from paganism Justin Martyr and Trypho the Jew.

Sources
The main source is Origen in his Against Celsus where he criticises Celsus' selective use of the text.

Origen's lukewarm defence of the text, his mention of the vigorous reply of Papiscus, and the Dialogue's use by Celsus, may explain the subsequent non-survival of the text. The loss of the document removes a potentially significant record of a 2nd-century Jewish Christian's arguments before later theological developments in the Christian church.

Jerome mentions the Dialogue twice. In Commentary on Galatians, in connection with he who is hanged on a tree is accursed of God (Commentary on Galatians, 2.3.13) and the Dialogue mis-citing Genesis 1:1 as "In the Son," (instead of "In the Beginning"), "God created the heaven and the earth." (Questions in Genesis, 2.507).

The third source is a letter (mistakenly included in the works of Cyprian) to a certain "Bishop Vigilius" (not Vigilius of Thapsus) describing a translation from Greek to Latin by an otherwise unknown Celsus, (given the sobriquet Celsus Africanus by scholars), which also describes the Dialogue, including the information that Jason himself was a convert from Judaism, and the ending - that Papiscus is convinced and asks for baptism.

A recent discovery in St. Catherine's monastery at Mount Sinai provides more text quoted from the Dialogue.

Dating and authorship
Lahey (2007) dates the Dialogue to c. 140 and considers a date of c. 160 unlikely since the Dialogue is believed to be a source or model for the Dialogue with Trypho, which is itself dated c. 160.

Maximus the Confessor (7th century, or possibly 6th century if mainly the work of John of Scythopolis as suggested by Hans Urs von Balthasar), notes that Clement of Alexandria, in the (now lost) sixth book of his Hypotyposes ascribes the Dialogue to Luke the Evangelist, though Maximus himself ascribes the authorship to Ariston of Pella, in Latin Aristo Pellaeus, an author whom Eusebius mentions in connection with emperor Hadrian and Simon bar Kokhba. No further trace of an attribution to Luke or Ariston is extant. Since the Dialogue was known to Celsus, Origen, Jerome and the later Latin translator "Celsus Africanus," none of whom names an author, the testimony of Maximus is now disregarded.

Scholarship
F. C. Conybeare proposed the hypothesis (1898) that two later traditions, the Dialogue of Athanasius and Zacchaeus (Greek, 4th century) and the Dialogue of Timothy and Aquila (Greek, 6th century), were based on an earlier text, and identified that text as the Dialogue of Jason and Papiscus. His thesis was not widely accepted.

References

2nd-century books
2nd-century Christian texts
Christian apologetic works
Jewish apologetics
Jewish–Christian debate
Lost books
Texts in Koine Greek